Gaining Through Losing is the fourth studio album released by Japanese singer Ken Hirai. It was released on July 4, 2001 on DefStar Records (Sony Music Entertainment).

Four singles are featured on the CD along with two Double A-Sides from the singles ("Tug of War" from Miracles and "Taboo" from Love or Lust). The album was ranked #21 for 2001 by Oricon for best selling albums. The style of the album continue on his two following albums, Sentimentalovers and Life Is....

A concert DVD was later released. The concert was filmed at Budokan and was titled Ken Hirai Films Vol.4 Live Tour 2001 gaining through losing at the Budokan.

Track list

Related works
Kiss of Life was featured on Ken Hirai 10th Anniversary Complete Single Collection '95-'05 Utabaka. Kh Re-mixed Up 1 featured Kiss of Life (Hex Hector Remix). His "[Missin' you: It will break my heart]" single featured (S.O.U.L.remix=Sound Of Urban London).
Kh Re-mixed Up 1 featured L'Amant (Da Lata remix).
Miracles appeared on Ken Hirai 10th Anniversary Complete Single Collection '95-'05 Utabaka, on The "Kiss of Life" (Silent Poets remix) and on Kh Re-mixed Up 1 (Silent Poets remix).
Tug of War was featured on the "Miracles" single and Kh Re-mixed Up 1 (United Future Organization Remix).
Merry Go-round Highway appeared on Kh Re-mixed Up 1 (Dj ajapai mix).
Taboo was featured on the "Love or Lust" single. and Kh Re-mixed Up 1 (a tip of M-Flo remix).
Love or Lust appeared on Kh Re-mixed Up 1 (V.I.P. remix). and on Ken Hirai 10th Anniversary Complete Single Collection '95-'05 Utabaka.
Even If was featured on Ken Hirai 10th Anniversary Complete Single Collection '95-'05 Utabaka.

2001 albums
Ken Hirai albums